is a professional Japanese baseball player.

External links

 NPB.com

1981 births
Living people
Baseball people from Ibaraki Prefecture
Japanese baseball players
Nippon Professional Baseball infielders
Yakult Swallows players
Tokyo Yakult Swallows players